The 1812 Ventura earthquake (also known as the Santa Barbara earthquake) occurred on the morning of December 21 at 11:00 Pacific Standard Time (PST). The 7.1–7.5 magnitude earthquake, with a Modified Mercalli intensity scale rating of X (Extreme), along with its resulting tsunami, caused considerable damage to present-day Santa Barbara and Ventura County, California, which was at the time a territory of the Spanish Empire.  One person was killed as a result of the earthquake while another from the aftershock. The earthquake occurred just as the region was recovering from another event on the 8th of December the same year. Both events are thought to have been related.

Geological setting 
see also: Thrust tectonics and Transverse Range

The San Andreas is the "master fault" of California, it is the main plate boundary in the San Andreas Fault System, consisting of other major active faults. This zone of interaction between the Pacific and North American Plates have resulted in hundreds of faults crisscrossing California. There are several strike-slip, reverse and thrust faults hidden under the Santa Barbara Channel that could produce devastating earthquakes and tsunamis, including a thrust fault that runs along the base of the Santa Monica Mountains. These faults are a result of the "Big Bend" in the San Andreas Fault when it meets with the Garlock Fault, exerting compression in the crust, forcing thrust and reverse faults to push crustal blocks upwards.

Earthquake origins 
Studies have placed the source of this earthquake on two faults. The location and source have not been agreed on, with some researchers providing the epicenter north of Wrightwood or in the Santa Barbara Channel.

San Andreas Fault 

Based on tree-ring sampling, forests were found to have suffered some type of trauma, and were experiencing slow growth in 1812. They were found to have been missing rings and crowns at around the same time. The trees took several years or decades to fully recover and return to their normal stage. These affected trees were found only in close proximity to the San Andreas Fault; in an event of a strong quake, trees at a considerable distance should also display evidence of trauma. A plausible cause might be that during slippage, the roots of these trees were severed, thus reducing the intake of nutrients and water required for growth. The violent shaking might also knock branches and parts off the trees off.

It is believed that the San Juan Capistrano earthquake on December 8 triggered a second rupture on the San Andreas Fault on December 21. The rupture on December 21 initiated in the south, and progressed northwards to Fort Tejon. Both events ruptured a total length of 170 km on the fault. The northern end of the rupture is still uncertain because of the overlapping southern rupture end of the 1857 Fort Tejon earthquake, 44 years later.

However, if the earthquake was sourced from the San Andreas Fault, the aftershocks should not be felt around the coastal regions of California. The documented aftershocks were felt locally, and there were reports of "odd disturbances" in the sea. Another challenge to the San Andreas hypothesis source is the lack of damage at Santa Barbara during the much more powerful 1857 earthquake. The section involved in the 1857 quake was closer to Santa Barbara and Ventura but were not felt severely like in the 1812 earthquake.

Claims of a tsunami and odd disturbances in the sea, can be attributed to a quake triggered landslide.

San Cayetano Fault 

The San Cayetano Fault is a 40 km long, north dipping reverse fault that extends from Ventura to the Sespe Mountains.

An epicenter proposed in the Santa Barbara Channel was based on reports of the large tsunami that flooded coastal communities. A study along the San Cayetano Fault in Ventura County revealed evidence of a fresh slip dating between 1660 and 1813 and has been interpreted as a powerful earthquake that was generated by the fault. Two large slip events were found at the trench dating back to the past 350 years along the fault. The magnitude of these events was estimated to be greater than  7.0 and likely ruptured the entire length of the fault.

Santa Barbara would later be damaged by another earthquake in 1925, that earthquake triggered a moderate, non-destructive tsunami. That earthquake may have occurred along the Mesa Fault or the Santa Ynez Fault System.

Impact and aftermath 
The first earthquake which may have been a foreshock, occurred at around 10:00–10:15 a.m.. At Mission La Purisima, padres, soldiers, and Native Indians ran out of the mission's buildings. They were still outside when the mainshock struck fifteen minutes later. This time, the shaking intensity was much more violent. Bells of the mission church started ringing and the adobe walls began to fracture and collapse. At the mission, a large fissure carved through the slopes of a hill erupted mud and water.

Damage was reported at Mission Santa Ines, Mission Santa Barbara, Santa Barbara Presidio, Mission San Buenaventura (Ventura), and Mission San Fernando as well. One person was killed by a falling boulder at Agua Caliente. At the various missions, many houses, churches, chapels, and other structures totally collapsed. Three adobe buildings were destroyed by the advancing tsunami. At Mission San Buenaventura and Mission Santa Barbara, the destruction was great, and a native man died when a building collapsed on him during an aftershock.

The low death toll for this large earthquake was attributed to a foreshock which occurred 15 minutes before the mainshock. The foreshock had driven many people out of buildings that would collapse later.

Devastation from this earthquake was comparable to the 1906 San Francisco and 1857 Fort Tejon earthquakes, but over a much smaller area. Frightened Chumash people on Santa Cruz and Santa Rosa islands fled to the mainland in their canoes and relocated there. For fears of another tsunami and aftershocks persisting, the missions were abandoned until April 1813.

Tsunami 
The captain of the Thomas Newland, a ship that was in Refugio Bay, watched as the sea receded, and later returned in a wave that lifted the ship and dumped it at Refugio Canyon, before taking it back out to sea. Run-up heights of 3–4 meters were recorded at Gaviota, although eyewitness said the tsunami may have been up to 15.2 meters (50 feet) high. The tsunami was also recorded at San Francisco.

See also 
 List of earthquakes in California
 List of earthquakes in the United States
 1927 Lompoc earthquake

References 

Earthquakes in California
1812 earthquakes
1812 in Alta California
1810s in Alta California
History of San Bernardino County, California
History of Southern California
Earthquake
December 1812 events
1812 in New Spain
Spanish missions in California
Tsunamis in the United States
Geology of San Bernardino County, California